A holy war is a religious war primarily caused or justified by differences in religion.

Holy War may also refer to:

Sports rivalries
 Holy War (Boston College–Notre Dame), college football
 Holy War (BYU–Utah), college football
 Holy War (Saint Joseph's–Villanova), college basketball
 Holy War (Kraków), Wisła Kraków vs. KS Cracovia, professional football

Music 
 Holy War (Dragonland album), 2002
 Holy War (Thy Art Is Murder album), 2015
 "Holy War" (Toto song), 2015
 "Holy Wars... The Punishment Due", a song by Megadeth, 1990
 Holy Wars (album), an album by Tuxedomoon, 1985
 "Holy War", a song by Jon Butcher Axis from Wishes
 "Holy War", a song by Alicia Keys from Here
 "Holy War, a song by Lovebites from Electric Pentagram
 "The Holy War", a song by Thin Lizzy from Thunder and Lightning

Other uses 
 Holy War (locomotive), a steam locomotive on the Bala Lake Railway in Wales
 Holy War (board game), a 1979 board wargame
 Holy Wars (film), a 2010 documentary film
 The Holy War, a 1682 novel by John Bunyan
 Holy War, Inc., a 2001 book by Peter Bergen

See also
 Fire Emblem: Genealogy of the Holy War
 Holy War, Batman!
 "Svyaschennaya Voyna", a song written on the day after the Nazi invasion of the USSR
 Crusade (disambiguation)
 Jihad (disambiguation)
 Religious conflict (disambiguation)
 Sacred War (disambiguation)
 War of Religion (disambiguation)